The Awful Fate of Melpomenus Jones is a very short story by Stephen Leacock. It was re-published in Literary Lapses in 1910. It is read by John Le Mesurier on a 1976 LP What Is Going To Become Of Us All? It was made into a short movie by Gerald Potterton in 1983.

It tells the story of a young curate, Melpomenus Jones who could not bear to say goodbye. He visits some friends and becomes trapped. After a couple of weeks he falls into "raging delirium of fever". After a month, the angels decided his stay was over, and he died.

"I would just like to say that I read this for school, I am very upset now. I do not suggest reading this for fun, it is too sadly relatable." - Recently Distraught Story Reader.

References 

Books by Stephen Leacock
Short stories adapted into films